HMS Conqueror was an ironclad battleship of the Victorian Royal Navy, whose main armament was an armoured ram.

She was the first ship of the Conqueror class to be laid down, her only sister-ship being , which was completed some two years later. At the time of her design it was thought that ramming attacks were the most effective offensive manoeuvre against armoured warships, as the armour of the period was, for a short time, able to defend against the majority of contemporary guns extant. This belief was reinforced by the action at the battle of Lissa, when the Austrian battleship Ferdinand Max rammed and sank the Italian Re DItalia. The Italian ship was at the time a stationary target, a detail which it appears did not receive, in naval architects' minds, the attention it deserved.

 Conqueror's breech-loading guns were of 12-inch (305-mm) calibre, and were twenty-five calibres (25 feet) long. They fired a shell weighing 714 pounds (324 kg) with a muzzle velocity of 1,910 ft/second (582 m/second), and could penetrate 10 inches (254 mm) of armour if the shell struck at or near a ninety-degree angle; much less, however, in the much more likely event of an oblique impact. They were placed very near to the deck, and it was found that a discharge over the bow caused marked blast damage to the deck and associated fittings. Firing abaft the beam caused blast damage to the bridge and superstructure, so in practice the guns could only fire on the beam, through an arc of some 45 degrees. The heavy artillery was only intended to be used against a target which had evaded a ramming attack, and was therefore on Conquerors beam.

The smaller guns were intended for use against small targets which could evade the ram and were not worth using the heavy artillery for. The torpedo tubes - six was the greatest number carried to date by a battleship - were placed aft and were intended for use against a target placed by accident or design astern of Conqueror, when the main armament would be valueless.

Service history
She was commissioned on 5 July 1887 for the Jubilee Review. She went into reserve at Devonport, becoming tender to the gunnery school Cambridge from 1889. She took part in manoeuvres on at least eight occasions, and was not otherwise ever out of sight of land. During manoeuvres she had a separate captain, but other than that appears to have been under the overall command of the captain on the Cambridge. In March 1900 three of her crew were severely injured in an accident during gunnery practice. She was paid off in July 1902 but took part in manoeuvres again during the summer of 1903; apart from that she remained swinging at anchor at Rothesay until being sold in 1907.

References

 Oscar Parkes, British Battleships 
 Conway, All the World's Fighting Ships 
 D K Brown, Warrior to Dreadnought 

 

Conqueror-class monitors
Ships built in Chatham
1881 ships
Victorian-era battleships of the United Kingdom